Our Lady of Victory Cathedral or Our Lady of Victories Cathedral may refer to:

Brazil
Our Lady of Victory Cathedral, Vitória

Cameroon
Our Lady of Victories Cathedral, Yaoundé

Japan
Our Lady of Victory Cathedral, Fukuoka

Lesotho
Our Lady of Victories Cathedral, Maseru

Senegal
Our Lady of Victories Cathedral, Dakar

United States
Our Lady of Victory Cathedral (Victoria, Texas)

See also
Our Lady of Victory (disambiguation)